Yelena Shubina (born 28 September 1974) is a Russian former swimmer who competed in the 1992 Summer Olympics.

References

1974 births
Living people
Russian female swimmers
Russian female freestyle swimmers
Olympic swimmers of the Unified Team
Swimmers at the 1992 Summer Olympics
Olympic bronze medalists for the Unified Team
Olympic bronze medalists in swimming
Medalists at the 1992 Summer Olympics